The Chiayi City Council (CYCC) is the elected city council of Chiayi City, Taiwan. The council composes of 24 councilors lastly elected through the 2022 Republic of China local election on 26 November 2022.

Organization

Congress
 Speaker
 Vice Speaker
 Councilors
 Committees
 Procedural Committee
 Disciplinary Committee
 The First Review Committee
 The Second Review Committee
 The Third Review Committee
 The Fourth Review Committee

Administrative unit
 Secretary-General
 Confidential Secretary
 Secretary
 Unit
 Agenda Affairs Section
 Legal Affairs Office
 General Affairs Section
 Personnel Office
 Accounting Office

Speakers
 Tsai Kuei-tzu (2012–2014)
 Hsiao Shu-li (2014–2018)
 Chuang Feng-an (2018–2022)
 Chen Zi-wen (2022-

Transportation
The council is accessible within walking distance West from Chiayi Station of Taiwan Railways.

See also
 Chiayi City Government

References

External links
 

1982 establishments in Taiwan
Chiayi
City councils in Taiwan